This is a list of airports in Catalonia, sorted by location.

Airports in Catalonia

Catalonia's busiest airports (2016)

See also 
 List of ports in Catalonia
 Transport in Catalonia
 Wikipedia: WikiProject Aviation/Airline destination lists: Europe

Footnotes

Catalonia
 
Airports
Airports
Catalonia